Kalahe is a village in Galle District in Sri Lanka, located  south-west of Galle and  west of Unawatuna.

Etymology
There are two stories as to how the name Kalahe is derived, the first relates to the fact the local population rebelled against the activities of the foreigners and so the village was called Kalahe, which means "quarreling". The other is that a golden pot (කළය) was found buried in the earth in the village, called Kalahe.

Transport
Kalahe is located on the  highway, connecting Galle to Madampe, not far from Exit 9 on the  Southern Expressway.

Attractions
 Yatagala Raja Maha Viharaya (Yatagala Temple), a rock temple with a 9m reclining Buddha, which has a 2,300-year-old Bo tree established during the reign of King Devanam Piyatissa of the Anuradhapura period. 
 Kalahe Methodist Church, constructed in 1879.

Education
 Kalahe Sri Sumangalodaya MV School

See also
List of towns in Southern Province, Sri Lanka

References

Populated places in Southern Province, Sri Lanka
Populated places in Galle District